Gueishan (龜山) may refer to:
Guishan District, Taoyuan City, Taiwan (Republic of China)
Gueishan Island, Yilan County, Taiwan (Republic of China)